Native American is an album by the American guitarist Tony Rice, released in 1988.

Track listing 
 "Shadows" (Gordon Lightfoot) – 3:43  
 "St. James Hospital" (James Baker) – 4:59  
 "Night Flyer" (John Mayall) – 4:00  
 "Why Have You Been Gone So Long" (Mickey Newbury) – 3:22  
 "Urge for Going" (Joni Mitchell) – 5:51  
 "Go My Way" (Lightfoot) – 2:48  
 "Nothin' Like a Hundred Miles" (James Taylor) – 4:21  
 "Changes" (Phil Ochs) – 2:21  
 "Brother to the Wind" (Craig Bickhardt, F.C. Collins) – 3:28  
 "John Wilkes Booth" (Mary Chapin Carpenter) – 3:52  
 "Summer Wages" (Ian Tyson) – 4:03

Personnel 
 Tony Rice – guitar, vocals
 Vassar Clements – fiddle
 Jerry Douglas – dobro
 Robbie Magruder – drums
 Mark Schatz – bass
 Rico Petrucelli – bass
 Wyatt Rice – guitar
 John Jennings – guitar
 John Edwards – harmonica, background vocals
 Jimmy Gaudreau – mandolin
 Mary Chapin Carpenter – harmony vocals, background vocals
 Jon Carroll – piano, keyboards, background vocals
Production notes
 Tony Rice – producer
 John Jennings – producer
 Bill Wolf – producer, engineer, mixing
 Joanna Bodenweber – design
 Mark Farris – photography

References 

1988 albums
Tony Rice albums
Rounder Records albums